McKillop, MacKillop, Mackillop may refer to:

People
McKillop (surname), the surnames McKillop, MacKillop, and Mackillop

Places
Electoral district of MacKillop
Huron East, Ontario (redirect from McKillop Township) 
Rural Municipality of McKillop No. 220, Saskatchewan
McKillop, Ontario 
McKillop Street, Melbourne 

Schools
Clairvaux Mackillop College
MacKillop Catholic College, Canberra
MacKillop Catholic Regional College, Werribee
MacKillop College (disambiguation)
MacKillop College, Bathurst
MacKillop College, Mornington
MacKillop College, Swan Hill
Mary MacKillop Catholic Regional College, South Gippsland
Mary MacKillop College, Kensington
Mary MacKillop College, Wakeley
Mary MacKillop Interpretive Centre
St Mary MacKillop College, Albury
St Mary MacKillop College, Canberra